IMVU (stylized as imvu) is an online virtual world and social networking site. IMVU was founded in 2004 and was originally backed by venture investors Menlo Ventures, AllegisCyber Capital, Bridgescale Partners, and Best Buy Capital. IMVU members use 3D avatars to meet new people, chat, create, and play games. In 2014, IMVU had approximately six million active players, and had the largest virtual goods catalog of more than 6 million items as of 2011. The business was previously located in Mountain View, California. It was known as one of the leading practitioners of the lean startup approach.

The company name was neither an acronym nor an initialism. IMVU co-founder Eric Ries described the accidental process by which the company acquired its meaningless name, and stated "It's not an acronym; it doesn't stand for anything", though he did note the name was originally used because the IM aspect invoked instant messaging, something the company wanted to be associated with.

Credits
IMVU contains its own economy with a currency system based on IMVU "credits" and "promo credits." A third form of currency also existed for creators, known as "developer tokens," which were earned when a user purchases an item with "promo-credits." Credits could be purchased online using actual currency directly from IMVU. Credits can also be attained through IMVU gift cards available from retail outlets, as well as completing surveys and the game's daily spin, where a player can win either an item or an amount of credits.

Promotional credits, abbreviated to “predits,” were a second form of currency distributed to members by IMVU and could be obtained by participating in various "Partner" promotions and a few activities that IMVU provides. With relation to a standard free or full member, promo-credits were similar to standard credits. A given number of credits equates, promo-credits could not be used to purchase items as gifts for other members and may not be traded back to an IMVU re-seller for actual currency. Promo-credits used to purchase a virtual product were exchanged into "developer tokens," also known as "dev tokens." The purchase transferred the promo-credits into developer tokens but netted a single developer token per purchase when promo-credits were used regardless of the price of the product purchased. In early 2021, the developers of the game made it possible for players to gift credits, hinting of a possible business addition to the game in the future.

Community
Users also devote time to customizing their individual homepages, setting up public and private rooms, creating and participating in user groups (similar to forums but personalized via the owner), and participating in the Community forums. users can create their own worlds, dance clubs, paradise resorts, even space stations, homes, and mansions. Additionally, there are numerous user-produced third-party websites providing additional forums and resources to the IMVU community. IMVU users are also able to conduct peer review on virtual products waiting to be submitted into the IMVU catalog, with a reward of 10 promo-credits per product review.

References

Further reading

Virtual world communities
Windows instant messaging clients
American companies established in 2004
Technology companies established in 2004
2004 establishments in California
Companies based in Redwood City, California

See also  
Smeet